Dovydas Šakinis (born July 2, 1992) is a Lithuanian professional tennis player and a member of Lithuania Davis Cup team.

Šakinis started playing tennis at the age of six, he trained at the Šiauliai tennis school. As a junior player he reached the world No. 73 combined ranking on ITF junior circuit (on January 4, 2010). Šakinis studied liberal arts at Dartmouth College in the United States from 2012 to 2016.

Davis Cup 
Šakinis is a member of the Lithuania Davis Cup team, having posted a 3–5 record in singles and a 1–3 record in doubles in ten ties played.

References

External links 
 
 
 
 Dovydas Šakinis at the Šiauliai tennis school 

Lithuanian male tennis players
Sportspeople from Šiauliai
1992 births
Living people
21st-century Lithuanian people